An Eye On X (Daybreak), 1995, is a short film produced and directed by Pogus Caesar, about the Birmingham micro sculptor Willard Wigan.

An Eye On X was filmed in Birmingham, United Kingdom.

Synopsis
The film follows Wigan's quest in carving two statues of American black activist Malcolm X to commemorate his visit to Smethwick, Birmingham in 1965. One figure is 3 mm high on the head of a toothpick, and the other life sized and carved in chestnut.

Cast
Malcolm X

Soundtrack
The soundtrack was composed by Ranking Roger of British ska band The Beat.

Other information
The film was commissioned by Carlton Television and Arts Council, and made by Pogus Caesar's company Windrush Productions.

External links

British television films
1995 television films
1995 films
1990s short documentary films
British short documentary films
Documentary films about visual artists
Films about Malcolm X
1990s English-language films
1990s British films